The 11th Cabinet of North Korea was elected by the 1st Session of the 11th Supreme People's Assembly of North Korea on 3 September 2003. It was replaced on 9 April 2009 by the 12th Cabinet.

Members

References

Citations

Bibliography
Books:
 

11th Supreme People's Assembly
Cabinet of North Korea
2003 establishments in North Korea
2009 disestablishments in North Korea